Eriospermum lanceifolium is a species of geophytic plant of the genus Eriospermum.

Description
Eriospermum lanceifolium bears a single, erect, slender (16 cm x 4–5 cm), lanceolate leaf, with undulate (sometimes hairy) margins. The leaf is a blue colour; it is a tough, leathery texture.

Eriospermum lanceifolium has a lumpy irregular tuber, which is pinkish inside.

Related species
This is one of several Eriospermum species that have erect, slender, lanceolate leaves, including Eriospermum exile, Eriospermum graminifolium and Eriospermum bayeri.

Distribution and habitat
It is indigenous to granite or sandstone soils in the Western Cape, South Africa. 
It occurs from the Olifants River mountains as far as the town of Albertinia.

References 

lanceifolium
Renosterveld